Lichina is a genus of lichens in the family Lichinaceae. The genus contains seven species. These cyanolichens include maritime species such as L. pygmaea or L. confinis, in which the associated cyanobiont has been assigned to the genus Rivularia. Furthermore, evidence of a high specificity of each mycobiont towards particular cyanobiont lineages in both species has been detected.

Species
Lichina antarctica  (1876)
Lichina confinis  (1821)
Lichina intermedia  (2017)
Lichina minutissima  (1973)
Lichina pygmaea  (1817)
Lichina tasmanica  (1969)
Lichina willeyi  (1969)

References

Lichinomycetes
Lichen genera
Taxa described in 1817
Taxa named by Carl Adolph Agardh